The 1889 Montana gubernatorial election took place on October 1, 1889. This was the first gubernatorial election in Montana. Democratic candidate Joseph Toole narrowly beat Republican candidate Thomas C. Power. Toole was the only Democrat elected for Montana's six executive offices. Toole was sworn in on November 8, 1889, and his term ended January 2, 1893.

Toole would be elected again in 1900 and 1904. He resigned near the end of his third term due to ill health. He is the longest served Governor of Montana, at 11 years, and the only Governor elected to nonconsecutive terms. Power would be elected United States Senator by the Montana Legislature after statehood.

General election

Results

References

Montana
Gubernatorial
1889
November 1889 events